The women's heptathlon event at the 1988 World Junior Championships in Athletics was held in Sudbury, Ontario, Canada, at Laurentian University Stadium on 29 and 30 July.

Medalists

Results

Final
29/30 July

Participation
According to an unofficial count, 23 athletes from 18 countries participated in the event.

References

Heptathlon
Combined events at the World Athletics U20 Championships